The 1988 Montana gubernatorial election took place on November 8, 1988. Incumbent Governor of Montana Ted Schwinden, who was first elected in 1980 and was re-elected in 1984, declined to seek re-election to a third term, creating an open seat. Stan Stephens, the former president of the Montana Senate, won a close Republican primary, and advanced to the general election, where he was opposed by Thomas Lee Judge, Schwinden's predecessor as governor and the Democratic nominee. Though the general election was hotly contested, Stephens ultimately defeated Judge, becoming the first Republican to win a gubernatorial election in Montana since 1964.

Democratic primary

Candidates
Thomas Lee Judge, former Governor of Montana
Frank B. Morrison, Jr., former Montana Supreme Court Associate Justice
Mike Greely, Attorney General of Montana
Ted Neuman, State Senator
Martin J. "Red" Beckman
Curly Thornton

Results

Republican primary

Candidates
Stan Stephens, former president of the Montana Senate
Carl Winslow, State Representative
Jim Waltermire, Montana Secretary of State

Campaign
Jim Waltermire, the Montana Secretary of State, was widely perceived to be the frontrunner in the primary, but, two months before the election, he was killed in a plane crash. Following his death, the race was narrowed down to Stan Stephens and Carl Winslow, though Waltermire remained on the ballot. Stephens earned the endorsement of much of the Republican establishment in the state, and campaigned on his experience in elected office and his success in the private sector. Winslow, meanwhile, campaigned on his youth and his ability to attract new businesses to the state.

Results

General election

Results

References

Montana
Gubernatorial
1988